The elections for the members of the Philippine Assembly were held on June 6, 1916 pursuant to the Philippine Organic Act of 1902 which prescribed elections for every three years. After the passage of the Jones Law on August 29, 1916 in where the Philippine Assembly would be replaced by the House of Representatives of the Philippines or the Lower House, the elected members of the Philippine Assembly would be automatically members of the new House of Representatives.

Results

 Partido Democrata Nacional

References

  

1916
History of the Philippines (1898–1946)
1916 elections in Asia
1916 in the Philippines